Ride of the Valkyrie is a 1967 British short comedy film directed by Peter Brook and starring Julia Foster, Zero Mostel, and Frank Thornton.

Plot

An opera singer (Zero Mostel), dressed in full costume and dress, must navigate through the busy city streets to get to the theater in time for his performance.

Cast

 Zero Mostel
 Julia Foster
 Frank Thornton

History and production
It was originally commissioned by producer Oscar Lewenstein, then a director of Woodfall, as one third of a 'portmanteau' feature entitled Red White and Zero, with sections supplied by Lindsay Anderson, Tony Richardson and Karel Reisz

Reisz dropped out with his section becoming Brook's Ride of the Valkyrie. The two other planned sections of the film developed into what became Richardson's Red and Blue and Anderson's The White Bus. Of these, only The White Bus received a theatrical release in the UK.

References

External links
 

1967 films
1967 comedy films
Films directed by Peter Brook
Films scored by Howard Blake
1967 short films
British comedy short films
1960s English-language films
1960s British films